
A Man with an Axe is an 1891 oil on canvas painting by Paul Gauguin, now in a Swiss private collection. It is one his first major paintings from his Tahiti period being painted shortly after his arrival in Papeete. A study for it is now in the Art Institute of Chicago.

History 
Paul Gauguin would arrive in Papeete on Tahiti in the summer of 1891. He came looking a simplicity that he had failed to find in Paris. The scene of a man with an axe chopping at a dead tree and a woman arranging nets was one that Gauguin observed in front of his hut. Gauguin referred to this central figure as "Totefa", "Jotepha", "Jotefa" and versions of Joseph" although these may all be his own inventions. Gauguin used some of the most potent colours that had been seen in painting up until that point which he explained as his observations of the natural hues of Tahiti and his forgoing of the traditional European studio procedure.

It has been interpreted that the painting represents the ending of Gauguin moral crisis and his liberation from the conventions of European culture. It has also been said to represent the Gauguin's fascination with the "primitive"; with the man representing raw masculine power and the woman being a symbol of pre-Christian innocent sexuality.

See also
List of paintings by Paul Gauguin

References

Notes

Citations

Bibliography

 
 
 
 

1891 paintings
Paintings by Paul Gauguin
Paintings in Switzerland
Ships in art